Buddha Colony is a mixed residential neighbourhood in Patna, the capital city of Bihar. It is encircled by East Boring Canal Road, Rajapur- Bansghat road, Sri Krishna Nagar and Mandiri-Chakaram. It is a spacious residential colony, with broad roads and lanes. The area is served by Buddha Colony police station under Patna Police.

Transportation
Buddha Colony is 3 km from Patna Junction railway station and 4.5 km from Jay Prakash Narayan International Airport.

Major Landmarks
North Mandiri
B. D. Public School
College of Arts and Crafts, Patna
Patna Women's College
Patna Museum
Mount Carmel High School, Patna

References

Neighbourhoods in Patna